Ram Narayan or Ramnarayan is an Indian male given name.

People with the name include:

 Ram Narayan (born 1927), Indian sarangi musician
 Ram Narayan Bishnoi (1932–2012), Indian Rajasthani politician
 Ram Narayan Chakravarti (1916–2007), Indian phytochemist
 Ram Narayan Deoki (1905–1964), Fiji Indian minister of the Methodist Church of Fiji and Rotuma
 Ramnarayan Dudi (born 1948), Indian Rajya Sabha member for Rajasthan
 Ram Narayan Goswami (died 2010), Indian West Bengali politician and Rajya Sabha member
 Ramnarayan Rawat, Indian historian and professor at the University of Delaware
 Ram Narayan Sharma (1915–1985), Indian independence advocate and trade unionist
 Ram Narayan Singh (1885–1964), Indian independence leader and Lok Sabha member

Indian masculine given names